Teflon is a registered trademark of the Chemours company used for polytetrafluoroethylene (and other fluoropolymers).

Teflon may also refer to:

Chemicals
 Teflon AF, copolymers of tetrafluoroethylene and 2,2-bis(trifluoromethyl)-4,5-difluoro-1,3-dioxole used as membrane materials
 Teflon FEP, fluorinated ethylene propylene used as a high-temperature insulation for wire
 Teflon tape or thread seal tape, (use deprecated by the trademark owner)

Music
 "Teflon" (song), a 1998 song by the Australian band Jebediah
 "Teflon", a song on the album Octahedron by the American band The Mars Volta

See also
 Teflon Brothers, a hip hop and rap group from Helsinki, Finland
 Teflon Diva!, a 1997 album by Arthur Loves Plastic
 Teflon-coated bullet, bullets that have been covered with a coating of polytetrafluoroethylene
 Teflon flu, inhalation fever caused by the fumes released when polytetrafluoroethylene is heated

ta:டெஃப்லான்